JN1 may refer to:

Jewish News One or JN1, a Jewish and Israeli current affairs news network
Jodi Number One, a TV reality dance show broadcast in India